Bill Deck (September 28, 1915 – February 22, 2011) was an American baseball player who played for the Negro National League's Philadelphia Stars in 1939. He later played for the Bacharach Giants from 1947 to 1951. Previously, he played for semi-professional teams.

From 1943 to 1946, he served in the United States Marine Corps.

References 

1915 births
2011 deaths
Philadelphia Stars players
Baseball players from Philadelphia
United States Marine Corps personnel of World War II
20th-century African-American sportspeople
21st-century African-American people